The Lioré et Olivier LeO H.242 was a French-manufactured flying boat that was used for European passenger air services in the 1930s. Several were operated by Air France.

One LeO H.242 features at the end of Hergé's The Adventures of Tintin comic King Ottokar's Sceptre.

Variants
H-24.01
First prototype. Powered by two 373 kW (500 hp) Renault 12Jb engines. One built.
H-241
The initial four-engined long-range heavy-weight variant of the H-24. The hull was almost exclusively made of anodised Duralumin, for corrosion resistance. Although construction began before the H.242, the sole H.241 was completed later, but did not enter production.
H-242
Initial production. Powered by four Gnome-Rhône 7Kd Titan Major radial engines. Two were built for Air France and delivered in December 1933 and February 1934. They could carry ten passengers.
H-242/1
Revised production version, with a modified engine installation. Twelve were built for Air France and delivered between March 1935 and May 1937, carrying twelve passengers. Most H.242/1s were fitted with wide chord NACA cowlings over the front engine only, but some aircraft were fitted with narrow chord Townend rings around the front engine.
H-243 an un-built projected version for the French navy with enlarged hull.
H-244A projected high-speed inter-continental flying boat for Air Union, abandoned when Air Union was absorbed by Air France.
H-246
A major redesign, the four engines now all in tractor configuration.

Operators

Air France

Regia Aeronautica - Captured aircraft.

Specifications (H-242/1)

See also
 Lioré et Olivier LeO H-246

References

Bibliography
Bousquet, Gérard. French Flying Boats of WW II. Sandomierz, Poland: Stratus, 2013 
Donald, David (editor).The Encyclopedia of World Aircraft. Leicester, UK: Blitz, 1997. 

1930s French airliners
Flying boats
H-242
Four-engined push-pull aircraft
High-wing aircraft
Engine-over-wing aircraft
Aircraft first flown in 1929